The Tri-State Tollway is a toll highway in the northeastern part of the U.S. state of Illinois. It follows:
Interstate 80 from I-94/I-294/IL 394 in South Holland to I-294 in Hazel Crest;
Interstate 294 from I-80/I-94/IL 394 in South Holland to I-94 in Northbrook; and
Interstate 94 from I-294 in Northbrook to US 41 in Newport Township.

Transportation in Lake County, Illinois
Transportation in Cook County, Illinois
Interstate 80
Interstate 94
Interstate 294